Bothasnek Pass (also known as just Bothasnek) is situated in the Mpumalanga province, on the R38 (Mpumalanga), the road between Barberton and Carolina (South Africa).

References

Mountain passes of Mpumalanga